CSKA Moscow, earlier known as Spartak Moscow, is a handball club from Moscow, Russia. CSKA is competing in the Russian Handball Super League  and in the SEHA League.

In reaction to the 2022 Russian invasion of Ukraine, the International Handball Federation banned Russian athletes, and the European Handball Federation suspended the  Russian clubs from competing in European handball competitions.

European competitions

Current squad
Squad for the 2022–23 season

Goalkeepers 
 82  Stanislav Tretynko
 93  Dmitry Kuznetsov
Left Wingers
 11  Sergey Nikolaenkov
 55  Dmitry Ionov
Right Wingers
9  Aleksei Fokin
 33  Daniil Shishkaryov
Line players
8  Se Cenlun
 71  Mikhail Zhyla
 74  Andrei Korkin

Left Backs
 10  Yulian Hiryk
 23  Ilya Belevtsov
 88  Artur Rudz
Central Backs
 25  Georgy Tokarev
 27  Valentin Vorobev
 72  Denis Afonin
Right Backs
5  Dmitrii Kiselev
 52  Siarhei Ivanov

Transfers
Transfers for the season 2022-23

Joining
  Artur Rudz (LB) (from  SKA Minsk)
  Denis Afonin (CB) (from  HC Don Cossack-SFU)
  Daniil Shishkaryov (RW) (from  Chekhovskiye Medvedi)
  Mikhail Zhyla  (P) (from  SKA Minsk)

Leaving
  Viktor Kireyev (GK) (to  Fűchse Berlin)
  Igor Soroka (LW) (to ?)
  Aliaksandr Padshyvalau (CB) (to  HC Meshkov Brest)  Pavel Atman (CB) (to  Maccabi Rishon LeZion)  Aleh Astrashapkin (RB) (to   Hapoel Rishon LeZion)  Gastón Mouriño (P) (to ?)
  Sergey Gorpishin (P) ''(to ?)

References

Russian handball clubs
CSKA Moscow